Amanda Rose Keller  (born 25 February 1962) is an Australian television and radio presenter, comedian, writer, actress, journalist and media personality, best known as the hostess of the popular Australian lifestyle program The Living Room. Keller also co-hosts Jonesy & Amanda with Brendan Jones on WSFM 101.7 and Dancing with the Stars with Grant Denyer on Network 10.

Education

Keller attended Carlingford High School and Mitchell College of Advanced Education (now Charles Sturt University), where she graduated with a Bachelor of Arts in Communications in 1982. At university, she was a contemporary of Andrew Denton among others, and was a student of Peter Temple. She was a broadcaster with on-campus community radio station 2MCE-FM.

Career
Her first professional media job was in 1983 as a researcher for the popular children's television show, Simon Townsend's Wonder World!  She was later a researcher and producer for Good Morning Australia when Gordon Elliott and Kerri-Anne Kennerley were hosts. By 1985, she was a researcher and producer for Ray Martin's Midday show, where she first began to appear regularly on camera.

In 1987, she left Midday to appear in the pilot for Richard Neville's counter-culture programme Extra Dimensions, which was produced by the same team that made Beyond 2000. Extra Dimensions folded after the first season.  Keller's luck changed when she was signed to Beyond 2000, the internationally popular science programme, where she won numerous media awards including the United Nations Association of Australia's Media Peace Award in 1989, and the Michael Daley Award for Science Journalism.

In 1994, she joined Andrew Denton as a regular guest on his show Denton, where she combined her scientific knowledge with her love of popular culture and kitsch—subsequently publishing a book, Amanda's Handy Home Hints. When the series finished in 1995, she joined Denton at Sydney radio station Triple M where they co-presented the breakfast show. At the same time, she hosted her own contemporary culture show on cable television called The Hub.

She hosted her own pop culture-centric program Mondo Thingo in 2004. In 2006, Keller appeared in Series Five of Dancing with the Stars where she progressed to the fifth round before being eliminated.

In 2008 she starred in the SBS TV series Swift and Shift Couriers as Amanda Doyle, the Regional Manager, and returned to this role for season two in 2011. Also, in 2011, she had a small role in another sitcom, Housos, also on SBS TV.

In 2009 for the duration of the show Keller was the Baby Boomers team leader on Network Ten's quiz show Talkin' 'Bout Your Generation. The show began airing in 2009 and finished its fourth season in 2012.

In 2017 she became one of the highest paid women in Australian radio. Also in that same year, she made a cameo appearance as a news reporter in episode 7547 of The Bold and the Beautiful alongside Brendan Jones and Ita Buttrose.

In 2019, Keller started co-hosting Dancing with the Stars with Grant Denyer.

She has also made appearances on shows such as Good News Week, Rove Live, The Glass House, 20 to 1, Spicks and Specks, All Star Family Feud, The Project, Studio 10, Show Me the Movie!, Have You Been Paying Attention? and Hughesy, We Have a Problem.

Personal life
She supports the Sydney Roosters rugby league team in the Australian National Rugby League.

Keller has two sons with her husband Harley Oliver and lives in Sydney.

Other
Keller is the patron of The Sydney Kids Committee, a volunteer organisation which raises funds for the Sydney Children's Hospital.

She holds the world record for the longest underwater radio broadcast which took place on 28 October 2010 when she and fellow WSFM breakfast show host Brendan Jones spent over three hours underwater at Sydney Aquarium.

In 2016 she was awarded the Medal of the Order of Australia (OAM) in the Queens Birthday Honours

Bibliography

and contributed with co host Brendan Jones to

References

External links

Interview in "The Age" newspaper
Amanda's collection of kitsch

1962 births
Living people
Australian television presenters
Australian women comedians
Australian women television presenters
Charles Sturt University alumni
Recipients of the Medal of the Order of Australia
Talkin' 'Bout Your Generation